Monza punctata is a butterfly in the family Hesperiidae. It is found in the Democratic Republic of the Congo, Uganda, Kenya, Tanzania, Malawi and Zambia. The habitat consists of forests.

The larvae possibly feed on Pennisetum species.

Subspecies
Monza punctata punctata (Democratic Republic of the Congo: Shaba, eastern Tanzania, Malawi, northern Zambia)
Monza punctata crola Evans, 1937 (Democratic Republic of the Congo, Uganda, western Kenya, north-western Tanzania)

References

Butterflies described in 1910
Erionotini